Mustafa Aksakal (born 1973) is a professor of history at Georgetown University.

Works

References

Georgetown University faculty
1973 births
Living people
Scholars of Ottoman history
Historians of World War I